Ostrau is a village and a former municipality in the district of Mittelsachsen in Saxony in Germany. On 1 January 2023, it was merged with Zschaitz-Ottewig to form the new municipality of Jahnatal.

Notable people
Konrad Schumann

References 

Mittelsachsen
Former municipalities in Saxony